Sleepout may refer to:

 CEO Sleepout UK, a charity that raises money to fight homelessness and poverty
 SleepOut.com, an e-commerce booking service
 Belvedere Sleep-Out, an annual charitable fundraising event at Belvedere College, Dublin, Ireland
 A tradition to ensure enrollment into desired classes at University of Chicago, Illinois, U.S.
 In Australia, a sleepout is an additional bedroom created by fully or partially enclosing a veranda, for example in Queenslanders